
Gmina Chmielnik is an urban-rural gmina (administrative district) in Kielce County, Świętokrzyskie Voivodeship, in south-central Poland.

The gmina contains parts of the protected areas called Nida Landscape Park and Szaniec Landscape Park.

Villages
Apart from the town of Chmielnik, Gmina Chmielnik contains the villages and settlements of Borzykowa, Celiny, Chomentówek, Ciecierze, Grabowiec, Holendry, Jasień, Kotlice, Łagiewniki, Lipy, Lubania, Ługi, Minostowice, Piotrkowice, Przededworze, Sędziejowice, Śladków Duży, Śladków Mały, Suchowola, Suliszów, Suskrajowice, Szyszczyce, Zrecze Chałupczańskie, Zrecze Duże and Zrecze Małe.

Neighbouring gminas
Gmina Chmielnik is bordered by the gminas of Busko-Zdrój, Gnojno, Kije, Morawica, Pierzchnica and Pińczów.

References
 Polish official population figures 2006

Chmielnik
Kielce County